Curtio Palumbo or Curzio Palumbo was a Roman Catholic prelate who served as Titular Bishop of Margarita (1622–?).

Biography
Curtio Palumbo was born in Naples, Italy.
In 1604, he served as vicar general of the Archdiocese of Naples after the death of Cardinal Alfonso Gesualdo di Conza.
On 30 Jun 1622, he was appointed during the papacy of Pope Gregory XV as Titular Bishop of Margarita.
It is uncertain when he died.

References

External links and additional sources
 (for Chronology of Bishops) 
 (for Chronology of Bishops)  

17th-century Roman Catholic titular bishops
Bishops appointed by Pope Gregory XV